Harri Rindell (born January 17, 1954) is a Finnish former professional ice hockey player. Rindell took over the head coaching duties for HIFK in the Finnish Liiga on February 28, 2014 as a mid-season replacement for Raimo Summanen.

Rindell played three seasons in the SM-liiga, registering 18 goals, 17 assists, 35 points, and 22 penalty minutes, while playing 104 games with HIFK between 1975–76 and 1977–78.

References

External links

1954 births
Living people
Finnish ice hockey coaches
Finnish ice hockey forwards
HIFK (ice hockey) players
Ice hockey people from Helsinki